Daniel Supplee Cobblestone Farmhouse is a historic home located at Starkey in Yates County, New York.  The farmhouse was built about 1835 and remodeled sometime before 1876.  It began as a vernacular, "L"-shaped, late Federal / early Greek Revival style farmhouse.  The cobblestone house is built of variously colored and irregularly shaped field cobbles. The farmhouse is among the nine surviving cobblestone buildings in Yates County.

It was listed on the National Register of Historic Places in 1992.

References

Houses on the National Register of Historic Places in New York (state)
Cobblestone architecture
Houses completed in 1835
Houses in Yates County, New York
National Register of Historic Places in Yates County, New York